The surname Campillo may refer to:

Gabriel Campillo (born 19 December 1978), boxer
Jorge Campillo (born August 10, 1978), baseball player
José del Campillo (1695–1743), Spanish statesman
José Ramón Rodil, 1st Marquis of Rodil (1789–1853), general and statesman, full surname "Rodil y Campillo"
 Jacinto Campillo, birth name of Pupi Campo, Cuban-American band leader

Spanish-language surnames